Gurez, or Gurais (Guráai in the local Shina language), is a valley located in the high Himalayas, about  from Bandipore and  from Srinagar, to the north of the Kashmir valley. It has diverse fauna and wildlife including the Himalayan brown bear and the snow leopard. The Kishanganga River flows through the valley.

The valley lies near the Line of Control, which separates it from the Astore and Neelum districts of Pakistan-administered Kashmir. Being situated very close to the Burzil Pass, which leads into Astore, the inhabitants are ethnic Dards/Shins. They speak the Shina language and have the same styles of dress and culture as their kinsmen in Pakistani-administered Gilgit-Baltistan.

Dawar is the central township in the area. The population of the area is estimated to be about 30,000, and is scattered among fifteen villages. Tourism industry is emerging , hotels like Gurez knights, kaka Palace, woodvibes provide service to tourists. 

Due to heavy snowfall (around ) and closure of Razdan Pass in winter, the valley remains cut off for six months of the year.

History
Historically, Gurez was part of ancient Dardistan, stretching between Sharada Peeth in the west, Minimarg in the north, Drass in the east, and Bagtore in the south. The valley falls along the ancient Silk Route, which connected the Kashmir Valley with Gilgit, before continuing further to Kashgar. Archaeological surveys in valleys north of Gurez have uncovered hundreds of carved inscriptions in Kharoshthi, Brahmi, and Tibetan. In particular, the carvings provide insights into the origins of the Kashmiri people and the early history of Buddhism.

The ancient capital of the Dards, Dawar, is located in the Gurez Valley and is an important archaeological site. Other archaeological sites of importance in the valley include Kanzalwan, where the last council of Buddhism is believed to have been held and, further downstream, the ruins of the ancient Sharda University are preserved along the Kishenganga/Neelum River.

Prior to the partition of Kashmir, Gurez had been a destination for foreign tourists, including Franklin Delano Roosevelt, who is known to have visited some time before he became the US president. During the colonial period, Gurez was often visited by trekkers. Nehru and Indira Gandhi, accompanied by Sheikh Abdullah, were among those who visited the area in the 1940s, fishing for trout at Naranag, one of the lakes in the mountains above the valley.

Geography

While describing the Kishenganga Valley (Gurez), Walter R. Lawrence writes in his book The Valley of Kashmir,

"Perhaps Pahalgam, the village of the shepherds that stands at the head of the Liddar valley with its healthy forest of pines, and Gurez, which lies at a distance of thirty-five miles from Bandipora, the port of the Wular Lake, will before long rival in popularity the other margs. Gurez is a lovely valley five miles in length lying at an elevation of about 8000 feet above the sea. The Kishenganga river flows through it, and on either side are mountains. The climate is dry and mild, excellent English vegetables can be grown, and the wild raspberries and currants are delicious."

"The valley is extremely picturesque, as the river comes dashing along through a rich meadow, partly covered with lindens, walnut and willow trees, while the mountains on either side present nothing but a succession of most abrupt precipices, and Alpine lodges, covered with fir trees."

Habba Khatoon

Gurez's most formidable peak is Habba Khatoon, around which legends abound and at one time, even a film starring Dimple Kapadia was planned. This pyramid shaped peak was named after the Kashmiri poet Habba Khatoon. She was a beautiful and intelligent woman from Saffron village chandhara, and originally known as "Zoon" (which means Moon in English). She was the daughter of a peasant Abuddi Rather, who married her to an illiterate peasant boy named Habba. Zoon was ill-treated by her mother-in-law and husband, because she spent most of her time in poetry and singing. Dejected by her plight, she changed her name to Habba Khatoon.

The emperor of Kashmir, Yousuf Shah Chak, was enthralled by her beauty, intelligence and poetry. He arranged her divorce from Habba and married her. According to the story, Shah Chak was imprisoned by his rival King Akbar, Habba Khatoon used to wander near the peak that now bears her name to look for her lover. After her husband's death, she wandered the banks of river Jhelum in mourning. She died twenty years later by drowning into the jhelum and now her tomb is at Athwajan.

Habba Khatoon Drama club was founded in 1976 by the poet Late Hajji Abdul Aziz Samoon (Retired Police Officer; SSP). The club played a pivotal role in safeguarding the cultural ethos and traditions of the Dard-Shin tribe. Hajji Abdul Aziz Samoon(KPS) was also Chairman of Jammu and Kashmir Dard-Shina Development Organization (JKDSDO), a body representing Dard community in the state JKDSDO

Economy

Energy
There is no central electricity in Gurez, although, as of 2009, a hydro-electric plant was constructed by the National Hydroelectric Power Corporation. It is unclear if any of the generated energy will be available to the valley itself. India had initially planned to construct a 100-metre-high dam on the Kishenganga, which would have flooded the majority of the Gurez Valley and forced nearly all of its residents to relocate. But due to resistance by the Dard Shin and by Pakistan Government, which is constructing a dam downstream, the dam's height was reduced to 37 metres. Set for completion in 2016, the dam now diverts water from the Kishenganga towards Wular Lake in Bandipora district via a 20 kilometre concrete tunnel, and generates 330 Mega Watts electricity for the Indian States.

Because of the lack of electricity, there is no significant industrial activity in the valley. The only electricity which is available comes from a few diesel generators which provide power to some parts of the area in summer for an hour at a time.
The Indian government's relocation plans are unclear, and it has not yet committed to providing hydroelectricity to those who will remain in the valley.

Fishery
As of 2006, there were plans to develop the fishery potential of the area, making it a resource for the surrounding region.

Fish in the river include:

 Brown trout (Salmo trutta fario)
 Rainbow trout (Salmo gairdneri)

Demographics

According to the 2011 census of India, Gurez Tehsil had a population of 37,992 people with 22,978 males and 15,014 females. The number of Scheduled Castes and Scheduled Tribes numbered 104 and 31,094 respectively. Most of the people in Gurez speak Kashmiri and Shina.

Religion

Gurez is majority Sunni Muslim. Before the arrival of Mir Sayyid Ali Hamadani, the region was predominantly Hindu. Hamadani visited the Kashmir valley three times, accompanied by about seven hundred preachers, known as "Sadaats". Of these seven hundred people, seven settled in Gurez and included Baba Abdur Razaq Shah and Baba Dervaish whose shrines are located near the hamlet of Fakirpora. The names of the other saints are unknown, although they also have shrines, located at Chorwan, Bagtore, Dangital Tulail across the Kishan Ganga River, and at Kamri across the border near Dood-Gagi village in Pakistan administered Jammu and Kashmir.

Islam is the largest religion in Gurez, followed by 84% of the people. Hinduism is the second-largest religion with 14.24% adherents. Sikhism and Christianity form 1.1% and 0.3% of the population respectively.

Peer Baba

The Peer Baba came from Multan (Pakistan) in 1933 and established himself in a cave at Durmat, north of Kanzalwan. He was about 35 years old, and his religion is unknown. He is said to have fasted for months without taking any food or water. On occasion, he came down to Kanzalwan and asked for food in Farsi with an Urdu accent. He never refused mutton offered by local Muslims. He was hard of hearing, spoke very little and was popularly known as "Nanga Baba". In Feb 1940, he came down from Durmat to Rajdhan during a heavy snowstorm and subsequently died. When the Dilawar Malik, one of the big landlords of Kashmir saw Peer Baba dead in a dream at the same spot, who was his devotee sent his men who tried to bring the Baba's body to Bandipur for burial, they were attacked by a large number of honeybees, and he was instead buried close to Razdaan Pass.

Transportation

Air
There is a helipad in the tehsil headquarters Dawar. There is another helipad in Badoab, 43 kilometres from Dawar. The nearest airport is Sheikh ul-Alam International Airport in Srinagar, located 150 kilometres from Dawar. A helicopter service was started in the region by the state government in 2017. Using this service people can reach Gurez from the Sheikh ul-Alam International Airport in 20 minutes cutting down the travel time by a huge margin.

Rail
There is no railway connectivity to Gurez Valley. The nearest railway station is Sopore railway station located 115 kilometres from Dawar.

Road
The tehsil is connected to other places in Jammu and Kashmir and India by the Bandipora–Gurez Road. Road connectivity has been a major issue for the population due to their being heavy snowfall during the winter months. In 2015 the Border Roads Organisation had submitted a proposal to the Indian Central Government for the construction of a 18-km long tunnel that would ensure year long connectivity of the Gurez to the rest of the Kashmir Valley. However the project has not moved past the DPR stage.

See also
 Markoot
 Dawar
 Tulail Valley
 Operation Eraze
 2017 Gurez sector avalanche

References

External links
 

Valleys of Jammu and Kashmir
Bandipora district
Kashmir